"Gee Whizz It's You" is a song by Cliff Richard and the Shadows, released as a single in March 1961 from their album Me and My Shadows. Despite not initially being officially released in the UK, it peaked at number 4 on the UK Singles Chart.

Release
"Gee Whizz It's You" was initially only intended for release in Continental Europe and, described as being export only, not released in the UK because it was included on the album Me and My Shadows and because "Theme for a Dream" has been released as a single towards the end of February. However, record dealers were able to order overseas records and due to demand from fans, thousands of copies were imported into the UK. After the single entered the UK top-20, the label "recognised its potential and belatedly released it as Cliff's 13th single". It was the first European single to chart in the UK.

Track listing
 "Gee Whizz It's You" – 2:08
 "I Cannot Find a True Love" – 2:34

Personnel
 Cliff Richard – vocals
 Hank Marvin – lead guitar
 Bruce Welch – rhythm guitar
 Jet Harris – bass guitar
 Tony Meehan – drums

Charts

References

1961 singles
1961 songs
Cliff Richard songs
Songs written by Hank Marvin
Songs written by Ian Samwell
Columbia Graphophone Company singles
Song recordings produced by Norrie Paramor